Usha Sangwan is an Indian business executive and entrepreneur currently Managing Director at Life Insurance Corporation of India, India's biggest life insurance company. She is the first woman to reach this position. She has now been appointed as an Independent Director at LIC of India. Usha is the daughter of Lakshman Das Mittal, founder of Sonalika Group.

Profile
Sangwan has a Master's in Economics and Human Resources from Punjab University.

Career
Earlier she has also handled LIC Housing Finance which is a subsidiary of LIC. She played an important role in turnaround of this company by raising $29.85 million through global depository receipts in 2004. She segregated marketing and underwriting divisions and introduced risk-based pricing.
She is one of the directors of Axis Bank

References

Living people
Indian women business executives
Businesswomen from Punjab, India
1958 births